Edward Jolley Crooke (7 January 1861 – 23 October 1940) was an Australian politician.

He was born in Rosedale to Edward Crooke and Maria Matilda Jamison. He attended Toorak Grammar School and Toorak College, and inherited his father's Rosedale property. He married Ada Menzies, with whom he had four children. He served on Rosedale Shire Council from 1889 to 1901 and from 1908 to 1940, and was thrice president (1892–93, 1895–96, 1923–24). In 1893 he won a by-election for the Victorian Legislative Council province of Gippsland. He was a minister without portfolio from 1900 to 1902. Crooke served until his retirement in 1922. He died in Melbourne in 1940.

References

1861 births
1940 deaths
Nationalist Party of Australia members of the Parliament of Victoria
Members of the Victorian Legislative Council